aka Serial Masturbation: Disorder is a 1994 Japanese Pink film directed by Toshiya Ueno. It was chosen as Best Film of the year at the 1994 Pink Grand Prix ceremony.

Synopsis
A man with a troubled past including incest with a younger sister and the murder of a woman travels to an isolated countryside town in Nagano. There a local who mistakes him for a famous television actor shows him the town's sites, including a strip bar in which the performers remove Heian era costumes. The film's narrative is in an allegorical and disjointed manner with references to Buddhist concepts. The title bears no relation to the story, and there are no masturbation scenes in the film. Loosely based on Kenji Nakagami's short story Aragami.

Cast
 Takeshi Itō
 Hitomi Aikawa
 Hotaru Hazuki
 Shirō Shimomoto
 Kazuhiro Sano

Critical reception
Besides winning the Best Film of the year at the Pink Grand Prix covering the year 1994, awards for Best Director (Ueno), Best Screenplay (Takahisa Zeze), Best Actor (Takeshi Itō), and Best New Actress, 2nd Place (Hotaru Hazuki) also went to the film.

Anglophone Pink film scholar Jasper Sharp calls the film one of director Ueno's most accomplished. He notes that by winning the Pink Grand Prix with this film, Ueno served as an advance guard for the "new wave" shichifukujin ("Seven Lucky Gods") group of pink film directors who came to prominence after the shitennō ("Four Devils"). In their Japanese Cinema Encyclopedia: The Sex Films, the Weissers call the film "an energetic, anxious-to-please pinku eiga", which "manage[s] to generate some of the most powerful, authentic sex scenes since the golden age of Nikkatsu."

Availability
The film was released on DVD in Japan on April 26, 2002, as  aka The Dragon God and Shurenge.

Bibliography

English

Japanese

References

1994 films
Films directed by Toshiya Ueno
1990s Japanese-language films
Pink films
Shintōhō Eiga films
1990s Japanese films